The Mugua River, also spelled Mukua River, is a tributary of the Hualien River in Taiwan. It flows through Hualien County for 42 km before joining the Hualien River in Ji'an, Hualien.

See also
List of rivers in Taiwan

References

Rivers of Taiwan
Landforms of Hualien County